Portable may refer to:

General
 Portable building, a manufactured structure that is built off site and moved in upon completion of site and utility work
 Portable classroom, a temporary building installed on the grounds of a school to provide additional classroom space where there is a shortage of capacity
 Portable toilet, a modern, portable, self-contained outhouse manufactured of molded plastic

Computing
 Portable object (computing), a distributed computing term for an object which can be accessed through a normal method call while possibly residing in memory on another computer
 Software portability, software that can easily be ported to multiple platforms
 Portable applications, applications that do not require any kind of installation onto a computer, and can store data in the program's directory

Electronics
 Portable electronics
 Portable device, a wearable or handheld device
 Portable audio player, a personal electronic device that allows the user to listen to recorded or broadcast audio whilst being mobile
 Portable computer, a computer that is designed to be moved from one place to another
 Compaq Portable series (1982–?)
 Apricot Portable (1984)
 IBM Portable Personal Computer (1984)
 Macintosh Portable (1989–1991) from Apple Computer
 Handheld game console, a lightweight, portable electronic machine for playing video games

Film
 Portable Film Festival at Portable.tv

Music
 Portable Life, a 1999 album by Danielle Brisebois
 Portable Sounds a 2007 album by TobyMac.

People 
 Portable, Nigerian singer-songwriter, rapper.

See also 
 Portability (disambiguation)
 
 

ja:ポータブル